Parallelia bistriaris, the maple looper moth, is a moth of the family Erebidae. The species was first described by Jacob Hübner in 1818. It is found in eastern North America.

Adults are on wing from April to September. There is one generation per year.

The larvae feed on various trees, including birch, maple, and walnut.

References

Catocalinae
Moths of North America